Ursulaea tuitensis is a plant species in the genus Ursulaea. This species is endemic to Mexico.

Cultivars 
 × Ursumea 'Ma Williams'

References 
BSI Cultivar Registry Retrieved 11 October 2009

tuitensis
Endemic flora of Mexico